Mohammad Boroujerdi (1955 – 1983/05/22) was an Iranian Islamic Revolutionary Guard Corps commander during the Iran–Iraq War. He played key roles in regaining control over the territories of Kurdistan by Iranian forces.

Early life 
Boroujerdi was born in "Darreh Gorg" village of Borujerd County to farmer parents. The name of the town was renamed after him then. The family inhabited in Tehran several years after the death of the father. He worked as a tailor and studied at nightly schools. Boroujerdi began to attend Quranic and theological courses at 14 years old. He married at 17.

Iranian Revolution 
Boroujerdi came into connect with "Islamic Coalition Party" before Iranian Revolution and was participating in their clandestine political and religious study groups. Boroujerdi faced mandatory military service, however he deserted and fled to Iran–Iraq border to meet Ruhollah Khomeini in Iraq. After capturing by SAVAK and confining for six months, he was forced to finish the military service. His mother narrates that she has seen them beating him during the imprisonment. A comrade, "Hemmat" related of his discord with PMOI members in prison, on him bound up with Fatwā. After the military service he restarted his political activities by contacting revolutionaries like Mahdi Iraqi; and replicating statements and audio cassettes of Khomeini in his home for publicization. He believed in armed struggle against Pahlavis, so he left to Syria in 1977 and contacted Musa al-Sadr and Mohammad Montazeri. Boroujerdi improved his military and partisan skills at the camps of Amal Movement. He left Syria to Lebanon and was acquainted with Mostafa Chamran. After the first major demonstrations to overthrow the Shah in January 1978, he led some guerrilla warfares against the monarchy in Iran.

His major activities at the time included:
 The head of escorts of Khomeini in his return from Paris,
 Disarmament of the police headquarter in Tehran,
 Participating in the building seizure of the National Iranian Radio and Television,
 Exploding the bus of American counselor in Lavizan.

After the victory 
Boroujerdi was responsible for Evin Prison for a short time. Afterwards, he joined AGIR with himself as one of the 12 founders.

Kurdistan 
After the command of  Imam Khomeini for suppressing the antirevolutionary rebellions at the dawn of the revolution, Boroujerdi went to Paveh. He helped breaking the siege of Sanandaj garrison occupied by communist guerrillas and federalist parties, including: KDPI, Fedai Guerrillas and Peykar. He put forward the establishment of "Muslim Peshmerga of Kurdistan" and served as its originator and commander. Boroujerdi was also the commander of AGIR in Kurdistan, and played important roles in regaining Sardasht, Baneh and Piranshahr from KDPI.

Iran–Iraq War 

As one of the commanders, he averted the fall of "Sar Pol-e Zahab", engineered by Saddam's army in October 1980. Although Boroujerdi served mostly in the west of Iran, but he was also involved in some military campaigns in the south; including Operation Tarigh ol-Qods for regaining Bostan and Operation Fath-ol-Mobeen. After the partitioning of AGIR, he was appointed as the commander of its seventh zone; which included Hamedan, Kermanshah, Kurdistan and Ilam provinces. He was also the deputy of "Hamzeh Seyedo-Shohaha" headquarter. His major protégés included: "Ahmad motavaselian", "Naser Kazemi" and "Mohammad Ebrahim Hemmat". Boroujerdi was killed (Martyr in Iran) by a land mine on Mahabad-Naqadeh road. His comrades have talked about his kindness, fair treatment of people, faith and stamina. He fathered two children.

See also 
 List of Iranian commanders in the Iran–Iraq War
 Military of Iran

External links 
 A short biography 
 A short biography

References 

People from Borujerd
1955 births
1983 deaths
Iranian military personnel killed in the Iran–Iraq War
Mojahedin of the Islamic Revolution Organization politicians
Islamic Revolutionary Guard Corps personnel of the Iran–Iraq War